Vitale Barberis Canonico is an Italian fabric mill established in 1663, in Pratrivero, located about 50 miles north of Turin in the northern Biella region. Francesco Vitale Barberis is the current creative director. 

The company's largest customer is the Italian fabric mill and luxury menswear fashion house Ermenegildo Zegna. Vitale Barberis Canonico has remained a family-owned business for 13 generations. 

In 2012, the wool mill was chosen by the Ferrari brand for the "tailor-made" project, which includes the possibility of personalizing one's car with Vitale Barberis Canonico fabrics.

In 2013, the year of the 350th anniversary of the wool business of the Barberis Canonico family, the wool mill became a member of Gli Henokiens, the international association reserved for family businesses with at least two hundred years of history.

In 2016, the company, which opened a historical archive for trendy fabrics from the 19th century onwards, exports 80% of the 9 million meters produced per year.

See also 
 Italian fashion
 Made in Italy

References

External links 
 

Italian companies established in 1663
Clothing brands of Italy
Clothing companies established in 1663
Fashion accessory brands
High fashion brands
Luxury brands
Menswear designers
Privately held companies of Italy
Textile companies of Italy